Tõnu Sepp (born June 14, 1946) is an Estonian music teacher and a figure in early music. He has been called the "grand old man" of early music in Estonia.

In 1971 in Viljandi Sepp laid the ground for early music education in Estonia and also founded the first early music ensemble in Estonia. In 1982 he launched the internationally famous Viljandi Early Music Festival. Since 1995, his led master class in Tallinn Old Town Educational College has grown into studio Musica Silentii. The studio is active in Tartu since 2006.

Sepp is also a renowned maker of musical instruments, having made hundreds of early music instruments.

References

Estonian musicians
Performers of early music
Founders of early music ensembles
Flute makers
Harp makers
1946 births
Living people
20th-century Estonian musicians
21st-century Estonian musicians